A Standing Order is a rule of procedure in the Parliament of the United Kingdom. Both the House of Commons and the House of Lords can set Standing Orders to regulate their own affairs. These contain many important constitutional norms, including the government's control over business, but it ultimately rests with a majority of members in each House.

House of Commons
The House of Commons Standing Orders concerns the following topics.

Election of the Speaker
Sittings of the House
Questions, motions, amendments and statements
Motions for Bills
General debates
Public money Bills
Programming of Bills
Grand committees and select committees
Public petitions
Parliamentary papers

House of Lords
The House of Lords Standing Orders contain similar rules to the Commons.

See also
UK constitutional law

Notes

External links
Current edition of House of Commons Standing Orders
Standing Orders of the House of Commons - Public Business, previous versions
Standing Orders of the House of Lords

Constitutional laws of the United Kingdom